Neuenkirchen is a municipality in the Vorpommern-Rügen district, in Mecklenburg-Vorpommern, Germany.

History 
Neuenkirchen is first mentioned in 1318 as Nygenkerke.

Until 1326, the village was part of the Principality of Rügen and, thereafter, the Duchy of Pomerania. Under the Treaty of Westphalia in 1648, Rügen, and thus the region of Neuenkirchen, became part of Swedish Pomerania. In 1815, Neuenkirchen
went to the Prussian Province of Pomerania as part of New Western Pomerania.

Since 1818, Neuenkirchen has been part of the county (Landkreis or Kreis) of Rügen. Only from 1952 to 1955 was it part of the so-called county of Bergen. From 1955 to 1990 it was part of the county (Kreis) of Rügen within the province of Rostock and, in 1990, also went into the state of Mecklenburg-Western Pomerania. The county (now a Landkreis again) of Rügen merged into the county of Vorpommern-Rügen in 2011.

Sights 
 Brick Gothic Church of Mary Magdalene, built between 1380 and 1450 with the oldest church bell on Rügen
 Trakehner horse stud farm at Gut Tribbevitz
 Neogothic manor house of Gut Tribbevitz
 Historic manor house of Gut Grubnow
 Hoch Hilgor viewing point with Grümbke Tower
 Neuendorfer Wiek and Beuchel Island Nature Reserve (bird island with seabirds and eagles)
 Tetzitzer See, Liddow Peninsula and Banzelvitz Hills Nature Reserve (crane and goose roosting area)
Rodeliner Berg viewing point on the Tetzitzer See with view of the Großer Jasmunder Bodden and valuable Trockenrasen fauna
 Viewing point near Moritzhagen (bird roost)
 Laaser Berge viewing point 
 Liddow cultural manor house as exhibition and project workshop
 Vieregge harbour village
 Former NVA (Nationale Volksarmee) base near Moritzhagen

References

External links

Towns and villages on Rügen